Milton Higgins Arnold (born July 15, 1974) is an American former professional tennis player.

Raised in Providence, Rhode Island, Arnold attended Milton Academy in neighbouring Massachusetts and first played tennis at the age of eight. He is a 1997 graduate of Harvard University.

Arnold was named on the Ivy League First Team for doubles in each of his four seasons at Harvard (1994-1997). As a senior in 1997 he and partner Thomas Blake earned All-American honors, reaching the NCAA doubles semi-finals.

While competing on the professional tour, Arnold had career best rankings of 491 in singles and 268 in doubles.

Arnold made three doubles main draw appearances at the ATP Tour tournament in Newport.

ITF Futures titles

Singles: (1)

Doubles: (3)

References

External links
 
 

1974 births
Living people
American male tennis players
Harvard University alumni
Harvard Crimson men's tennis players
Tennis people from Rhode Island
Sportspeople from Providence, Rhode Island